Moscow Society of Philatelists and Collectors was one of the first philatelic organisations in Soviet Russia that appeared in Moscow in 1918. Later on, it ceased and was replaced with the All-Russian Society of Philatelists.

History 
In Russia prior to the October Revolution, there was a well established and organised philatelic community. With the beginning of World War I, activity of Russian philatelic societies and magazines stopped. Communications with foreign philatelic societies were interrupted.

After the October Revolution, stamp collectors managed to obtain legalisation of philately in Soviet Russia. The new magazine, Russian Magazine of Collectors and Correspondents, established in 1916 and issued till July 1918, promoted the foundation of the Moscow Society of Philatelists and Collectors. It was set up in Moscow in March 1918. This was the first philatelic organisation in the RSFSR. Most members of the pre-revolutionary Moscow Society of Stamp Collectors joined the new society. It existed till February 1921. After its dissolution, the All-Russian Society of Philatelists was established in 1923.

See also 
 All-Russian Society of Philatelists
 First All-Union Philatelic Exhibition
 Leniniana (philately)
 Moscow Municipal Society of Collectors
 Moscow Society of Stamp Collectors
 Organisation of the Commissioner for Philately and Scripophily
 Philatelic International
 Soviet Philatelic Association
 Soviet Philatelist

References

Further reading 
  Archived from the original and another source on 2015-05-15.

Philately of the Soviet Union
1918 establishments in Russia
1921 disestablishments in Russia
Philatelic organizations
Organizations based in Moscow
Non-profit organizations based in Russia
Culture in Moscow
Defunct organizations based in Russia
Organizations established in 1918
Organizations disestablished in 1921